KPA may refer to:

 Keele Postgraduate Association, Keele University, UK, formerly Keele Research Association (KRA)
 Kensington (Olympia) station, London, England, National Rail station code
 Kenya Ports Authority
 Kiln phosphoric acid, a dry process to produce phosphoric acid at high temperature in a kiln
 Kilopascal (kPa), a unit of pressure
 Known-plaintext attack, a method of cryptanalysis
 Korean People's Army, the armed forces of North Korea
 Aruba Police Force (Dutch: Korps Politie Aruba)
 Kosovo Property Agency